Craspedolobium is a genus of flowering plants in the legume family, Fabaceae. It belongs to the subfamily Faboideae.

Species and Taxonomy
Currently the genus Craspedolobium only contains one accepted species. Formerly Craspedolobium schochii was also accepted, but it has since been synonymized with C. unijugum.

 Craspedolobium unijugum (Gagnep. Z.Wei & Pedley, 2010)

References

Millettieae
Fabaceae genera